Rajkiya Pratibha Vikas Vidyalayas (popularly known as RPVV or Pratibha) are a school system run by the Directorate of Education, Government of Delhi in Delhi, India. The member schools are in Raj Niwas Marg, Surajmal Vihar, Civil Lines, Yamuna Vihar,Kishan Ganj, Lajpat Nagar, Shalimar Bagh, Hari Nagar, Rohini, Paschim Vihar, Vasant Kunj, Lodhi Road, Link Road, Dwarka, Gandhi Nagar, Rohini sector 21, Gautampuri and Nand Nagri. Now RPVVs are Renamed as SoSE (School of Specialised Excellence) (Year 2021-22).

Admission 
An entrance test is conducted every year. The entrance test is the only gateway for admission in the RPVVs. Admission of students is in 6th, 11th standards. Due to the Covid-19 pandemic, no entrance test was held for the 2020–21 school year. Class 11th admissions held on the merit base of CBSE results of class 10th. In the 2021–22 session, students will get a chance for admission in both 6th and 7th class.

RPVV schools in Delhi 

 RPVV, Gautampuri New Usmanpur Delhi-110053
 RPVV, Raj Niwas Marg (Ludlow castle no-1)
 RPVV, Dwarka Sector 10 (Currently ranked No.1, 2018 by EDUCATIONAL WORLD) 53
 RPVV, Civil Lines (Ludlow castle no-3)
 RPVV, Dwarka Sector 5
 RPVV, Gandhi Nagar
 RPVV, B- Block, Hari Nagar, (Maya Puri Road)
 RPVV, Nai Basti, Kishan Ganj
 RPVV, Krishna Market, Lajpat Nagar
 RPVV, INA COLONY
 RPVV, Plot No. 1, Link Road, Karol Bagh
 RPVV, D-1, Nand Nagari
 RPVV, A-10, Pocket-5, Narela
 RPVV, A-6, Paschim Vihar
 RPVV, Sector-11, Rohini
 RPVV, B- Block, Shalimar Bagh
 RPVV, A- Block, JAHANGIR PURI
 RPVV, Surajmal Vihar
 RPVV, B-1 Vasant Kunj
 RPVV, B-Block, Yamuna Vihar
 RPVV, DWARKA, SECTOR-19, Delhi-75
 RPVV, ROHINI, SECTOR-21, Delhi-85
 RPVV, I.P. Extension, near Maayo College Delhi, New Delhi-110092.

Achievements
In 2018, RPVV DWARKA Sector 10 ranked 1st in all over India government school , in rankings of EDUCATIONAL WORLD.
In 2018, Prince Kumar student of RPVV DWARKA Sector 10 scored 496 out of 500 in XIIth boards and topped New Delhi's Science stream.
 The RPVV Paschim Vihar won the National Computer Literacy Excellence Award in 2003.
 The RPVV Dwarka and Shalimar Bagh were ranked 3rd and 6th respectively at an All-India survey conducted by Education World.
 In 2016 CBSE XII results, Kirti Dua from RPVV Civil Lines topped among Delhi state government schools in all streams by securing 97% from Science stream.
 In 2012 CBSE XII results, Sonali Goyal of RPVV, Shalimar Bagh topped among students in Delhi government schools, all streams with 96.8% marks.
 In 2013 CBSE XII results, a student named Ankit Saini of RPVV Dwarka topped among students in Delhi government schools with 97.4% marks.
In October 2009 a team of teachers from the United Kingdom visited Delhi schools, including the RPVVs, as part of a British Council programme to study education practices abroad.

References

Schools in West Delhi
Organisations based in Delhi
Schools in Delhi